Peter Culley (1958–2015) was a Canadian poet and photographer living in Nanaimo at the time of his death. He grew up on Royal Canadian Air Force (RCAF) bases in Ontario, Alberta, Saskatchewan and Scotland and lived in Nanaimo, BC since 1972. He was known for his “Hammertown” series, Hammertown, The Age of Briggs and Stratton, and Parkway, a re-imagination of Nanaimo and British Columbia. He was also an art critic who wrote extensively on Stan Douglas, Roy Arden, Kelly Wood and Geoffrey Farmer. He was involved with many writing scenes, including The Kootenay School of Writing in Vancouver, the Nanaimo poetry scene and poetry circles throughout North America.

Publications

Poetry

 Twenty-one, Fernie, BC: Oolichan Books, 1980
 Fruit Dots, Vancouver: Tsunami Editions, 1985
 Natural History, Vancouver: Fissure Books, 1986
 The Climax Forest, Vancouver: Leech Books, 1995
 Hammertown, Vancouver: New Star Books, 2003
 The Age of Briggs and Stratton, Vancouver: New Star Books, 2008
 To the Dogs, Vancouver: Arsenal Pulp Press, 2008
 Parkway, Vancouver: New Star Books, 2013

References

1958 births
20th-century Canadian poets
21st-century Canadian poets
Canadian male poets
2015 deaths